Augustowo  (Yagushtovo) is a village in the administrative district of Gmina Bielsk Podlaski, within Bielsk County, Podlaskie Voivodeship, in north-eastern Poland.

References

Augustowo
Podlachian Voivodeship
Grodno Governorate
Białystok Voivodeship (1919–1939)
Belastok Region